Difference, The Difference, Differences or Differently may refer to:

Music 
 Difference (album), by Dreamtale, 2005
 Differently (album), by Cassie Davis, 2009
 "Differently" (song), by Cassie Davis, 2009
 The Difference (album), Pendleton, 2008
 "The Difference" (The Wallflowers song), 1997
 "The Difference", a song by Westlife from the 2009 album Where We Are
 "The Difference", a song by Nick Jonas from the 2016 album Last Year Was Complicated
 "The Difference", a song by Meek Mill featuring Quavo, from the 2016 mixtape DC4
 "The Difference", a song by Matchbox Twenty from the 2002 album More Than You Think You Are
 "The Difference", a 2020 song by Flume featuring Toro y Moi
 "The Difference", a 2022 song by Ni/Co which represented Alabama in the American Song Contest
 "Differences" (song), by Ginuwine, 2001

Science and mathematics
 Difference (mathematics), the result of a subtraction
 Difference equation, a type of recurrence relation
 Differencing, in statistics, an operation on time-series data
 Data differencing, in computer science
 Set difference, the result of removing the elements of a set from another set

Other uses
 Differences (journal), a journal of feminist cultural studies
 Difference (philosophy), a key concept of philosophy
 Difference (heraldry), a way of distinguishing similar coats of arms

See also

 Different (disambiguation)
 Differential (disambiguation)
 Distinction (disambiguation)
 Deference, submitting to one's superior
 Différance, a French term coined by Jacques Derrida